Giladeh (also Romanized as Gīlā Deh; also known as Gilledekh) is a village in Heyran Rural District, in the Central District of Astara County, Gilan Province, Iran. At the 2006 census, its population was 545, in 124 families.

References 

Populated places in Astara County